Ezio Bosso (13 September 1971 – 14 May 2020) was an Italian composer, pianist, double bass player, and conductor. He composed film scores such as Un amore and Gabriele Salvatores' Io non ho paura, and ballets which were performed by The Royal Ballet and the San Francisco Ballet, among others. As a pianist, he released a solo album which entered the Italian charts.

Life 
Born in Turin in 1971, Bosso learned to read and play music before he was four and started to have his first piano lessons with his aunt who was a pianist. He studied piano, double bass, and theory at Turin Conservatorium. At the age of 14, he became the bass player for the ska/rhythm-and-blues band Statuto. At the age of 16, he started his career as a double bass and piano soloist in France. He collaborated with orchestras including the Vienna Chamber Orchestra and the Chamber Orchestra of Europe. Bosso later abandoned popular music in order to become an orchestral conductor and classical composer, studying the  double bass under Ludwig Streicher, composition under Claude Vivier and professor Schölckner, and conducting under Edgar Österreicher at the Vienna Music Academy. During his studies in Vienna he specialized on orchestra conducting and took lessons from great conductor Sergiu Celibidache who played crucial role for Bosso's career. He scored Gianluca Maria Tavarelli's Un amore (1999) and Gabriele Salvatores' Io non ho paura (2003).

In 2011, after undergoing surgery to remove a brain tumor, Bosso started suffering from a neurodegenerative syndrome. At first, the disease did not prevent him from playing, composing, and conducting music. He wrote ballet music, music for theatre, operas, film scores, five symphonies, concertos, and chamber music including string quartets, piano trios, and sonatas. He collaborated with soloists such as Mario Brunello and Sergei Krylov, and conducted orchestras including the London Symphony Orchestra. His compositions were featured in various performance art events, and theatrical productions. He also collaborated with theatre directors such as James Thiérrée and choreographers such as Rafael Bonachela.

On 30 October 2015, Bosso released his first solo studio album, . A collection of piano works including Bosso's own Piano Sonata, as well as music by Johann Sebastian Bach, Frédéric Chopin, Christoph Willibald Gluck, and John Cage's In a landscape, the album peaked at number three on the Italian FIMI albums chart, along with Adele and Coldplay. Some of Bosso's music for piano was compared to the work of Philip Glass.

In 2016, Bosso's music was used by the Royal Ballet for Christopher Wheeldon's Within the Golden Hour, which was first performed by the San Francisco Ballet. He also worked for La Scala in Milan and La Fenice in Venice, and received commissions from the Vienna State Opera, New York City Ballet and Bolshoi Theatre in Moscow.

In 2017, he started focusing more on conducting and composing. In September 2019, Bosso announced that due to his neurodegenerative illness, he was losing control of two fingers and was therefore no longer able to play the piano.

Bosso died in his home in Bologna on 14 May 2020 at the age of 48 after a long struggle with his illness.

Awards 
Bosso won several awards for his compositions, including the Australian Green Room Award and the Syracuse NY Award, and was nominated for two David di Donatello Awards.

Compositions 

Symphonies
 Symphony No.1: "Oceans"
 Symphony No.2: "Under the Trees" Voices
 Symphony No.3: "Four Letters" for string quartet and orchestra
 Symphony No.4: "Alma Mater"
 Little Symphony for a Pair of Glasses for orchestra

Compositions for orchestra
 Violin Concerto No.1 "ESOCONCERTO"
 Violin Concerto 1a for Violin, Strings and Timpani
 Violin Concerto No.2
 "Oceans" for Solo Cello and Orchestra (I Version, Only strings)
 Triplo Concerto For Piano, Violin, Cello and Orchestra
 Fantasia for Violin and Orchestra
 Adagio for cello and orchestra
 Divertimento concertante: fl, ob, cl, bsn, orchestra and piano
 Domes Of Freedom for Children Choir, orchestra and Mandolins orchestra
 Angeli 2 for orchestra
 Sea Song 2 Sea Prayer for cello and strings
 Sea Song 3 Waves and Hope for violin, cello and string orchestra
 Sea Song 6 Isles for string orchestra
 Sea Song 8 Fishes speech for 2 violins and strings
 Sea Song 9 sea rain for piano (or violin) and string orchestra
 Before the sea for cello orchestra
 African skies for double bass and strings
 Road Signs Variations for 11 instruments
 Entrance for solo viola, organ trumpet trombone and cello and orchestra
 The Cathedral in the Desert for and sax soprano and strings
 Speed limit, a night ride for string quartet and piano
 All directions for sax, trumpet, trombone, piano, el bass el guit, and strings
 Merge, one harm hug for strings
 Stop never stop the residence for sax, trumpet, trombone, piano, el bass el guitar, and string quartet
 Exit, Run 44 part 2 or sax, trumpet, trombone, piano, el. bass, el. guit, and string quartet
 The way of 1000 and 1 comet (orchestral version)
 African nights for solo bass (Viola or Cello) and String quartet (Also Orchestra)
 African skies for double bass and strings
 Angeli 3 for 2 oboes and strings
 Will and the chance for voice and ensemble
 Andante for piano orchestra choir and live electronic "postcards"
 Indian railway for double bass and winds
 My Thay for string orchestra

Duo
 Sonata No. 1 For violin and Piano "Unconditioned"
 Sonata for Piano and Cello "The Roots"
 Sonata for Violin and Piano "The Roots"
 Cadenza for violin and bass
 Clouds for violin and piano
 Duet for cello and bass
 Hermanos for guitar and bass
 Sonata (Angels 1) for contralto sax and double bass
 Sonatina for bass and piano
 Grains for cello (viola) and piano
 Sea Song 1 Before the Sea for cello and piano
 Sea Song 4 Anamì for violin and piano
 Introduction a la Patagonie pour contrebasse et percussions
 Following (a Bird) for Violin or cello and Piano
 Sweet and sour for Violin and Piano

Trio
 Split, postcards from far away for piano trio and live electronics
 Rain, In your Black eyes
 Diversion for piano trio
 The Things That Remain for Piano Trio
 Trio N. 4, Three drawing about missed steps
 The life that i like for double bass, accordeon and piano
 ZeNo for cello, flute and vibraphon
 Round about for viola cello and double bass
 Piano Trio No. 1 "No Man's Land"
 Sunrise on a clear day
 Thunders and lightnings

String Quartets
 Quartet No. 1 (Medoro's death)
 Quartet No. 2 Quattordici danze per bambini intorno a un buco for string quartet
 Quartet No. 3 "The way of 1000 and 1 comet" String quartet (AKA Wine Trances)
 Quartet No. 4 "The four letters"
 Quartet No. 5 " Music For The Lodger"
 The sky seen from the moon String quartet
 The last black String quartet
 The Gibigianna String quartet
 Gagarin String quartet
 One way for string quartet
 I was born child... String quartet
 Who cares about the Bluebird tunes, For string quartet
 Merge, one harm hug for string quartet
 New York Suite for saxophone quartet
 Mmm! For double basse, piano, clarinet and percussions
 The woman photographer's game, for string quartet

Compositions for one instrument
 Sonata No. 1 in G minor (The 12th Room)
 Missing a Part (The Waiting Room G)
 Snow for solo piano
 Smiles for Y for Solo Piano
 Following (a bird) for Solo Piano
 Split, Postcards From Faraway For solo Piano
 Sweet and Bitter for Solo Piano
 Concerto for solo bass
 Mmdu (Humans) for solo bass
 Suite in B minor for solo cello
 Cadenza for solo cello
 Forgotten smiles for solo violin
 Colloqui con se stesso (solo Doublebass)
 AmOx For Solo Bass
 Introduction à la Patagonie for Solo Bass

Vocal music
 Cross, an Allelujah for voice and piano quintet
 Laudate for 4 sopranos
 A Lullaby from Shakespeare for choir
 Introduction à la Patagonie pour contrebasse et percussions
 Nine 9 stories about humans and love for voices, 6 cellos and keyboards (lyrics by Pete Smith and E. Bosso)
 Set a place for voice and piano quintet
 Sleep reconciliation for voice and string quartet
 You'll never be lee marvin for voice and string quartet
 Our multiple selves survive for voice and piano quintet
 Sleep reconciliation for voice and string quartet
 I'm not a swan for voice, cello and piano
 Off the handle for voice, violin and piano
 Emily real #15 for actress 2 keyboards and strings and electric guitar (from 15 poems by Emily Dickinson)
 Cappotto di legno (From a text by Roberto Saviano) for rapper, strings and El. bass
 Suite del Regreso for voice Solo
 Air on the first star of the night for soprano and piano trio
 Hommage a Demetrio for double bass and voice
 The Perfect Mood Maker - The Stage London

Other compositions
 6 breaths for 6 (12) cellos and piano
 Sea Song 7 Deep seas for 3 viola 3 cello 2 double basses (8 cellos)
 Scherzo for 4 accordeons
 Fuga for percussions
 Mozart Human Variation for voices and tape
 Bach 855a for Piano, Choir and Strings

Ballets
 LandForms 2011 (Bonachela, Sydney Dance Company)
 6 Breaths 2010 (Bonachela, Sydney Dance Company)
 We unfold 2009 (Bonachela, Sydney Dance Company)
 The Land Of Yes and The Land of No (Bonachela, BDC, Southbank)
 Within the Golden Hour 2008 (C. Wheeldon San Francisco Ballet)
 AmOx 2008 (R. Bonachela, Saddlers Wells)
 Riapertura 2007 (C. Wheeldon, Ballet Boyz, Royal Festival Hall)
 Tenderhook 2007 (L. Lorent - Scottish Dance theater)
 Moments 2006 (Ballet Boyz, Saddlers Wells)
 The body and the bass (T. Yap, Art council Melbourne) 1998
 The breath of the thramp (R. Castello, Danse scenen Copenaghen) 1997
 Traveller 1995 (T. M. Rotella, Teatro di Dioniso)
 6 november 1994 (P. Bianchi Agar)
 Flautus 1994 (P. Bianchi Agar)
 Friendship is a Root

Opera
 Alcina 1994
 Orlando 2002
 Simone e il mago 2000
 Mercuzio 1997
 Ezio Bosso's The Venice Concert, La Fenice Theatre

Theater
 Io non ho paura, quattordici danze per bambini, Salvatores - Bosso 2003
 Aspettiamo quello simpatico, R. Papaleo 2001
 Moi je s'addresse, C. Galland 2000
 Qoeleth e il cantico dei cantici, D. Riondino 1999
 La confessione biologica, A. Catania 1998
 Studio su amleto, V. Malosti 1997
 Sogno di una notte di mezza estate, V. Malosti 1996
 A score for Amleth, V. Malosti 1995
 Cuori, V. Malosti 1994
 La stanza di Emily V. Malosti 1994
 Agamemnon, R.Cuocolo 1995
 Nina, V. Malosti 1996
 Percorsi, V. Malosti 1992
 Genio buono vs Genio Cattivo, V. Malosti 1992
 Il mio Giudice,text by Maria Pia Daniele, director V Malosti 1993
 Studio per contrabbasso e ombre, E. Bosso 1995
 Amleth machine, E. Bosso 1992
 Watershakespear, V. Malosti 1991SoundtracksMovies Un amore, conducted by Gianluca Maria Tavarelli (1999)
 Qui non è il paradiso, conducted by Gianluca Maria Tavarelli (2000)
 Ribelli per caso, conducted by Vincenzo Terracciano (2001)
 Io non ho paura, conducted by Gabriele Salvatores (2003)
 Quo vadis, baby?, conducted by Gabriele Salvatores (2005)
 Rosso come il cielo, conducted by Cristiano Bortone (2005)
 Il dolce e l'amaro, conducted by Andrea Porporati (2007)
 Il ragazzo invisibile, conducted by Gabriele Salvatores (2014)Short movies Tre vite perfette 2002
 L'ospite 2002
 Cecchi Gori Cecchi Gori 2001
 Svelarsi al silenzio 1989
 Will and Chance 1998
 Una casa poco solida 1995Silent movies' Voyage au Soleil 1995
 Voyage en Italie 1995
 62 short movies of Méliès 1995
 Die tolle Lola 1996
 Le voyage dans la lune 1996
 The Man with the Camera 1996
 Ecrin du marajah 2004
 Il diavolo zoppo 2004
 Marriage dans la Lune 2004
 Tango Tangeles 2004
 Voyage sur Jupiter 2004
 The Lodger (1926 Alfred Hitchcock) 2006

 Discography 
 Seasong 1 to 4 and other little stories (2011)
 Six breaths (2013)
 The 12th Room (2015)
 ...And The Things That Remain (2016)
 The Venice Concert (2016)
 Ezio Bosso Stradivarifestival Chamber Orchestra (2017)
 The Venice Concert (2017)
 The Roots (A Tale Sonata)'' (2018)
 A Life In Music (2020)

References

External links

 
 Ezio Bosso  unitedagents.co.uk
 
 
 Italy bids farewell to composer Ezio Bosso wantedinmilan.com 15 May 2020
 

1971 births
2020 deaths
Musicians from Turin
Italian composers
Italian classical musicians
Italian male conductors (music)
Neurological disease deaths in Emilia-Romagna
Deaths from motor neuron disease
21st-century Italian conductors (music)
21st-century Italian male musicians
Italian classical pianists
Male classical pianists
Italian male pianists
20th-century Italian conductors (music)
20th-century Italian male musicians
20th-century classical pianists
Italian bass guitarists